Ajay Agarwal is a lawyer in the Supreme Court of India and a politician. He is the candidate representing the Bharatiya Janata Party from Rae Bareli in the 2014 Indian general election. During his tenure on the Supreme Court, he filed public interest litigations in several cases including the Bofors scandal, the Taj corridor case, and the fake stamp paper scam run by Abdul Karim Telgi.

In addition to being a professional advocate, he is also a social activist and a crusader against corruption and contested many public interest litigation targeting corruption at the highest level. His PIL in Taj corridor case led to the fall of Mayawati government in UP in 2003. His another PIL for initiating CBI enquiry in Abdul Karim Telgi fake stamp scam case involving fifty thousand crores scam in 2003 also paid results and besides the supreme court ordered CBI enquiry in this matter, union government had to introduce e-stamp to stop the circulation of fake stamp scam paper. He had filed special leave petition  in public interest in Bofors scam before the supreme court when CBI failed to file it, because the permission to file SLP was denied to the CBI by the then UPA government because of the instructions by the UPA chairperson Mrs. Sonia Gandhi. He also filed a criminal writ petition in Ottavio Quattrocchi case in January 2006 when an additional Solicitor General wassent to London by the union government to get the accounts of Ottavio Quattrocchi  defreezed and Hon’ble Supreme Court had passed status quo of the London accounts. His another PIL in Commonwealth scam and IPL scam also brought positive results.

Shri Ajay Agrawal filed public interest litigation before Honorable Supreme Court for fixing of RT PCR Test cost at Rs 400 per test while in some states the charges are as high as Rs 3600 /- per test. Honorable Supreme Court issued notice to the Central Government and state Governments and the price will start slashing down immediately. Now in Delhi it is charged Rs 400/- per test as was demanded in the petition. 

In 2014 Lok Sabha elections BJP has fielded him as its candidate in Rae bareli to contest against UPA chairperson Mrs. Sonia Gandhi where in he polled  One Lac Seventy five thousand votes on his own since no big leader of the BJP visited for campaigning in Rae bareli during the elections. He is now again shot to the Limelight because of his Bofors matter which he got listed for final hearing, by mentioning before the Chief Justice of India, in the last week of October. He is also asked the CBI to open the entire investigation afresh in the light of many evidences which he had with himself.

References 

Living people
Supreme Court of India lawyers
National Democratic Alliance candidates in the 2014 Indian general election
Bharatiya Janata Party politicians from Uttar Pradesh
1965 births